Matupi Harbour is a harbour near Rabaul in East New Britain province, Papua New Guinea. It is located between Praed Point and Matupi Island. Simpson Harbour is to the west and Blanche Bay to the south.

East New Britain Province
Ports and harbours of Papua New Guinea